The Minister of Agriculture is a ministerial portfolio in the government of New Zealand. It was re-created as a standalone portfolio in 2017 after previously existing continuously from 1889 to 1998, and again from 1999 to 2012. The current Minister is Damien O'Connor.

Responsibilities and powers
The minister's responsibilities include protecting and promoting the productivity, sustainability and export performance of New Zealand's agricultural sector. They are also the lead minister for the Ministry for Primary Industries, which is the government department that provides support to the portfolio. Previously the minister was responsible for smaller departments such as the Ministry of Agriculture and Forestry.

The minister is responsible for legislation related to the agricultural sector including the Animal Welfare Act 1999 and the Dairy Industry Restructuring Act 2001.

History
John McKenzie established the Department of Agriculture on 31 March 1892, and the first minister, George Richardson, was appointed on 17 October 1889. Prior to Keith Holyoake receiving it in 1949, the portfolio "had become notorious as a political graveyard". The fisheries portfolio was briefly combined in the agriculture portfolio between 1972 and 1977.

In the Shipley minority government, the position was disestablished and replaced with the new role of Minister of Food, Fibre, Biosecurity and Border Control, which consolidated ministerial responsibility for the Ministry of Agriculture and Forestry, Ministry of Fisheries, Land Information New Zealand and the New Zealand Customs Service. The change was unpopular with the farming sector and was reverted by the incoming Labour government in 1999.

In the second and third terms of the Fifth National Government, the portfolio was again disestablished and merged into the larger position of Minister for Primary Industries. A standalone agriculture ministerial position was restored in 2017.

List of Ministers of Agriculture

Key

Table footnotes:

See also 
Minister for Primary Industries

Notes

References

External links
 Agriculture portfolio at the New Zealand Government website
 Ministry of Agriculture and Forestry

Agriculture in New Zealand
Agriculture